The 451st Air Expeditionary Group is a provisional United States Air Force USAFCENT unit.  It is assigned to Kandahar Airfield and is also the host unit at Kandahar.  It reports to the 455th Air Expeditionary Wing at Bagram Air Base.

The group provides an airpower presence in the Afghanistan area of operations.  Its airmen provide intelligence, surveillance and reconnaissance, command and control, remotely piloted aircraft operations, and airborne data link capabilities.

During the Cold War, the Strategic Air Command 451st Strategic Missile Wing was the first fully operational HGM-25A Titan I ICBM wing in 1962. During World War II, the wing's predecessor unit, the 451st Bombardment Group was a Consolidated B-24 Liberator heavy bombardment organization, assigned to Fifteenth Air Force in Italy.

Units
 62d Expeditionary Reconnaissance Squadron (launch and recovery for MQ-1 Predator and MQ-9 Reaper)
 73d Expeditionary Air Control Squadron
 303d Expeditionary Fighter Squadron
 361st Expeditionary Reconnaissance Squadron
 430th Expeditionary Electronic Combat Squadron
 451st Expeditionary Operations Support Squadron
 772d Expeditionary Airlift Squadron
 451st Expeditionary Communications Squadron
 451st Expeditionary Civil Engineering Squadron
 451st Expeditionary Logistics Readiness Squadron
 451st Expeditionary Security Forces Squadron
 451st Expeditionary Force Support Flight

Tenant units
 466th Air Expeditionary Squadron
 809th RED HORSE Squadron
 777th Expeditionary Prime BEEF Squadron
 807th Expeditionary Air Support Operations Squadron

History

World War II

Organization and training in the United States
The first predecessor of the group was activated on 1 May 1943 as the 451st Bombardment Group at Davis–Monthan Field, Arizona, with the 724th, 725th, 726th and 727th Bombardment Squadron]]s assigned as its original elements. Although original plans were for the group to be an Operational Training Unit at Davis–Monthan, instead a cadre of the group moved to Dyersburg Army Air Base, Tennessee, where it was filled out by personnel drawn from the 346th Bombardment Group.  Key group staff, plus the commanders and a model crew from each squadron received advanced tactical training with the Army Air Forces School of Applied Tactics at Orlando Army Air Base, Florida.  This cadre joined the remainder of the group at Wendover Field, Utah for training with the Consolidated B-24 Liberator. The group continued its training at Fairmont Army Air Field, Nebraska, starting in September.   On 18 November, the air echelon of the group departed Fairmont for staging at Lincoln Army Air Field, Nebraska to ferry their aircraft via the Southern Ferrying Route to the Mediterranean Theater of Operations.  The ground echelon left on 26 November for the port of embarkation at Camp Patrick Henry, Virginia, for transportation by ship.

Combat operations
The group arrived at Gioia del Colle Airfield, Italy at the beginning of January 1944, although the air echelon remained at Telergma Airfield, Algeria until 20 January to conduct additional training. The group functioned primarily as a strategic bombing unit, attacking targets like oil refineries, marshalling yards, aircraft factories and airfields in Italy, Germany, France, Czechoslovakia, Austria, Bulgaria, Hungary, Romania, Greece and Albania.  It earned a Distinguished Unit Citation during Big Week for an attack on a Messerschmitt aircraft factory at Regensburg, Germany on 25 February 1944.  It added oak leaf clusters to this award for an attack on oil refineries and marshalling yards at Ploesti, Romania on 5 April 1944 and on Markersdorf-Haindorf Airfield near Vienna, Austria on 23 August 1944.  On each of these missions the 451st was opposed by large numbers of enemy interceptor aircraft and heavy flak, but fought its way through to inflict serious damage on the targets and destroy many enemy aircraft.

When returning from the Regensburg attack, runway conditions at Gioia del Colle were so poor that the aircraft of the 451st Group were unable to land there, but spread out among a number of bases in Italy.  These poor conditions continued and on 8 March group headquarters and the 724th and 726th Squadrons moved to San Pancrazio Airfield, Italy, while the 725th and 727th Squadrons moved to Manduria Airfield.  

On 6 April, the group assembled at Castelluccio Airfield.  From its new base, the group also flew air support and interdiction missions.  It helped prepare the way for Operation Dragoon, the invasion of southern France in August 1944.  The following month its bombers transported supplies to forces operating in Italy, It also supported Operation Grapeshot, the final advance of Allied armies in northern Italy. The group's last mission was flown on 26 April 1945 against marshalling yards at Sachsenburg, Austria.

The group assembled later in the month at Dow Field, Maine, where it was inactivated on 26 September 1945. Personnel that were not discharged from the service on return to the United States were transferred to Air Transport Command units at Dow.

Strategic Air Command

The second predecessor of the group was organized at Lowry Air Force Base, Colorado as the 451st Strategic Missile Wing (ICBM-Titan) on 1 July 1961. The wing assumed the missiles, personnel and equipment of the inactivating 703d Strategic Missile Wing. The 703d Wing had never achieved full operational status, so 451st became the first fully operational HGM-25A Titan I missile wing. Construction on all 18 silos at the six launch complexes was completed by 4 August 1961. On 18 April 1962, Headquarters SAC declared wing's the 724th Squadron operational, and two days later the first Titan Is went on alert status. A month later, the sister 725th Strategic Missile Squadron, which had replaced the 849th Strategic Missile Squadron, declared it had placed all nine of its Titan Is on alert status, which marked a first in Strategic Air Command.

On 19 November 1964, Defense Secretary Robert McNamara announced the phase-out of remaining first-generation SM-65 Atlas and Titan I missiles by the end of June 1965. This objective was met. All wing missiles went off alert status on 26 March 1965 and the wing phased down for inactivation. On 25 June 1965, the wing and the 724th and 725th Squadrons were inactivated. SAC removed the last missile from Lowry on 14 April 1965.

Global War on Terrorism

The 451st Air Expeditionary Group was activated in 2002, conducting operations from Kandahar Airfield, Afghanistan. The group was responsible for air control of the southern region of Afghanistan, launch and recovery operations for the MQ-1 Predator and MQ-9 Reaper aircraft, the employment of combat search and rescue forces throughout the entire country and ground security and defense of the airfield. Included in the group are safety, logistics, communications, civil engineer.

Due to the growth in size and requirements of the USAF mission at Kandahar, the 451 AEG was enlarged to a wing-level organization, redesignated as the 451st Air Expeditionary Wing (451 AEW) and activated as such on 2 July 2009.

The wing was downsized to a group in January 2014 as part of the Afghanistan drawdown.

Former components:
 451st Expeditionary Operations Group
 702d Expeditionary Airlift Squadron (C-27J Spartan, 31 July 2011 – 18 June 2012)
 451st Expeditionary Maintenance Group
 451st Expeditionary Aircraft Maintenance Squadron
 451st Expeditionary Maintenance Squadron
 451st Expeditionary Mission Support Group
 651st Air Expeditionary Group
 26th Expeditionary Rescue Squadron (inactivated 1 January 2014)
 46th Expeditionary Rescue Squadron (September 2010 – inactivated early 2013)
 651st Expeditionary Aeromedical Evacuation Squadron (inactivated Dec 2013)

Lineage
 451st Bombardment Group
 Constituted as the 451st Bombardment Group (Heavy) on 6 April 1943
 Activated on 1 May 1943
 Redesignated 451st Bombardment Group, Heavy on 10 May 1943
 Inactivated on 26 September 1945
 Consolidated on 31 January 1984 with the 451st Strategic Missile Wing as the 451st Strategic Missile Wing

 451st Strategic Missile Wing
 Established as the 451st Strategic Missile Wing (ICBM-Titan) 1 July 1961 and activated (not organized)
 Organized 1 July 1961
 Discontinued and inactivated on 25 June 1965
 Consolidated on 31 January 1984 with the 451st Bombardment Group
 Redesignated 451st Air Expeditionary Group, converted to provisional status and assigned to Air Combat Command to activate or inactivate as needed on 3 May 2002
 Activated 2 May 2002
 Redesignated 451st Air Expeditionary Wing 2 July 2009
 Redesignated 451st Air Expeditionary Group c. 3 January 2014

Assignments
 II Bomber Command, 1 May 1943
 Second Air Force, 6 October 1943
 47th Bombardment Wing, c. 11 December 1943
 49th Bombardment Wing, 7 April 1944
 Air Transport Command, c. 19 June –  16 September 1945
 Strategic Air Command, 26 April 1961 (not organized)
 13th Air Division (later 13th Strategic Missile Division), 1 July 1961 – 25 June 1965
 Air Combat Command to activate or inactivate as needed
 455th Air Expeditionary Wing, 2 May 2002
 9th Air and Space Expeditionary Task Force, 2 July 2009 – present

Components
 Groups
 451st Expeditionary Maintenance Group, 2 July 2009 – 3 January 2014
 451st Expeditionary Mission Support Group, 2 July 2009 – 3 January 2014
 451st Expeditionary Operations Group, 2 July 2009 – 3 January 2014

 Squadrons
 724th Bombardment Squadron (later 724th Strategic Missile Squadron), 1 May 1943 – 26 September 1945; 1 July 1961 – 25 June 1965
 725th Bombardment Squadron (later 725th Strategic Missile Squadron), 1 May 1943 – 26 September 1945; 1 July 1961 – 25 June 1965
 726th Bombardment Squadron, 1 May 1943 – 26 September 1945
 727th Bombardment Squadron, 1 May 1943 – 26 September 1945

Stations

 Davis–Monthan Field, Arizona, 1 May 1943 – 5 June 1943
 Dyersburg Army Air Base, Tennessee, 3 June 1943
 Wendover Field, Utah c. 18 July 1943
 Fairmont Army Air Field, Nebraska 9 September – 16 November 1943
 Gioia del Colle Airfield, Italy c. 10 January 1944

 San Pancrazio Airfield, Italy c. 5 March 1944
 Castelluccio Airfield, Italy c. 6 April 1944 – June 1945
 Dow Field, Maine c. 19 June – 16 September 1945
 Lowry Air Force Base, Colorado 26 April 1961 – 25 June 1965
 Kandahar International Airport, Afghanistan, 2002 – 2021

Aircraft

 Consolidated B-24 Liberator, 1943–1945
 HGM-25A Titan I 1961–1965
 General Dynamics F-16 Fighting Falcon Post 2002
 Fairchild Republic A-10C Thunderbolt II Post 2002
 Lockheed Martin C-130J Super Hercules Post 2002
 Alenia C-27J Spartan Post 2002
 Northrop Grumman E-11A BACN Post 2002
 Beechcraft U-21 King Air Post 2002
 Sikorsky HH-60G Pave Hawk Post 2002
 Beechcraft MC-12 Huron Post 2002
 General Atomics MQ-1 Predator Post 2002
 General Atomics MQ-9 Reaper Post 2002

References

Bibliography

 
 

 Further reading

 
 Hill, Michael. The 451st Bomb Group in World War II: A Pictorial History. Atglen, Pennsylvania: Schiffer Publishing, 2000. .

Notes
 Explanatory notes

 Citations

External links
 651st Air Expeditionary Group emblem

451